This article lists Croatian-language grammar books. The enumerated grammar books give a description and prescription of Croatian as it evolved throughout history.

Croatian grammars before the 20th century

Croatian grammars in the 20th century

References
 
 
 

Grammar Books
Grammar Books
Lists of books
Grammar books
Serbo-Croatian books